Giancarlo Guerrero (born 1969) is a Costa Rican, Nicaraguan-born, US-based music director. He is the music director of the Nashville Symphony in Nashville, Tennessee. Guerrero is also Music Director of the Wrocław Philharmonic at the National Forum of Music in Wrocław, Poland and Principal Guest Conductor of the Gulbenkian Orchestra in Lisbon, Portugal. He was formerly the associate conductor of the Minnesota Orchestra and the music director of the Eugene Symphony. He has won six Grammy Awards.

Early life
Guerrero was born in Managua, Nicaragua. He emigrated to Costa Rica, where he joined the Costa Rica Youth Symphony and the Costa Rican National Symphony Orchestra. He graduated from Baylor University, where he earned a bachelor's degree in 1991, and he earned a master's degree from Northwestern University.

Career
Guerrero was music director of the Táchira Symphony Orchestra in Venezuela. From 1999 to 2004, he was the associate conductor of the Minnesota Orchestra, where he made his subscription debut in March 2000 leading the world premiere of John Corigliano's Phantasmagoria on the Ghosts of Versailles. He was the music director of the Eugene Symphony from 2001 to 2008. He became the seventh music director of the Nashville Symphony at the beginning of its 2009–2010 season. He is also the principal guest conductor of the Gulbenkian Orchestra in Lisbon. He is the Music Director of the Wroclaw Philharmonic at the National Forum of Music. From 2011 to 2016, he was the principal guest conductor of The Cleveland Orchestra Miami Residency.

An advocate of new music and contemporary composers, Guerrero has collaborated with and championed the works of American composers, including John Adams, John Corigliano, Osvaldo Golijov, Roberto Sierra, Jennifer Higdon, Aaron Jay Kernis, Michael Daugherty, and Roberto Sierra. His first recording with the Nashville Symphony, on Naxos, of Michael Daugherty's Metropolis Symphony and Deux Ex Machina, won three 2011 Grammy Awards, including the category of Best Orchestral Performance. In 2018, Guerrero won his sixth GRAMMY Award for a recording of music by Jennifer Higdon.

Guerrero has appeared with major North American orchestras, including the symphony orchestras of Baltimore, Boston, Cincinnati, Dallas, Detroit, Houston, Indianapolis, Milwaukee, Philadelphia, San Diego, Seattle, Toronto, Vancouver, and the National Symphony Orchestra in Washington, DC; as well as at several major summer festivals, including the Los Angeles Philharmonic at the Hollywood Bowl, Cleveland Orchestra at Blossom Music Festival, and Indiana University summer orchestra festival. He has worked with the Frankfurt Radio Symphony, Brussels Philharmonic, Deutsche Radio Philharmonie Saarbrücken Kaiserslautern, Orchestre Philharmonique de Radio France, Netherlands Philharmonic Orchestra, Residentie Orkest, and the London Philharmonic Orchestra, as well as the São Paulo State Symphony Orchestra (OSESP), in Brazil, the Queensland Symphony Orchestra and Sydney Symphony in Australia. Guerrero conducted new productions of Carmen, La Bohème and Rigoletto for the Costa Rican Lyric Opera. In February 2008, he conducted Osvaldo Golijov's Ainadamar at the Adelaide Festival.

In June 2004, Guerrero was awarded the Helen M. Thompson Award by the American Symphony Orchestra League, which recognizes outstanding achievement among young conductors nationwide.

Personal life
Guerrero resides in Brentwood, Tennessee, a suburb of Nashville, with his wife, Shirley, and their two daughters.

Awards
Giancarlo Guerrero has won six Grammy Awards in his career:
2011: Grammy Award for Best Orchestral Performance for Daugherty: Metropolis Symphony; Deus Ex Machina
2012: Grammy Award for Best Classical Instrumental Solo for Schwantner: Concerto for Percussion & Orchestra (with the Nashville Symphony Orchestra and soloist Christopher Lamb)
2015: Grammy Award for Best Classical Compendium for Paulus: Three Places Of Enlightenment; Veil Of Tears & Grand Concerto (with the Nashville Symphony Orchestra)
2016: Grammy Award for Best Classical Compendium and Grammy Award for Best Classical Instrumental Solo for Daugherty: Tales of Hemingway (with the Nashville Symphony Orchestra and soloist Zuill Bailey)
2017: Grammy Award for Best Classical Compendium for Higdon: All Things Majestic (with the Nashville Symphony Orchestra)
2020: Grammy Award for Best Contemporary Classical Composition for Rouse: Symphony No. 5 (with the Nashville Symphony Orchestra)

References

External links
 Official website

20th-century conductors (music)
21st-century conductors (music)
Costa Rican conductors (music)
Costa Rican expatriates in the United States
Grammy Award winners
Living people
People from Managua
People from Nashville, Tennessee
1969 births